Johan Coenen (born 4 February 1979 in Wellen) is a Belgian former professional road bicycle racer, who rode professionally between 2002 and 2015 for the Marlux,  and  teams.

Major results

2000
 1st La Côte Picarde
 8th Flèche Ardennaise
2002
 2nd Tour du Finistère
2003
 1st Stage 6 Bayern Rundfahrt
 7th Kuurne–Brussels–Kuurne
 9th Tour du Doubs
 10th Overall Étoile de Bessèges
2004
 2nd Rund um den Henninger Turm
 2nd Strombeek-Bever Koerse
 3rd Paris–Camembert
 4th Omloop van het Waasland
 7th Overall Tour de Luxembourg
 9th Grand Prix Pino Cerami
2005
 1st Grand Prix de la Ville de Lillers
 7th Flèche Hesbignonne
 9th Overall Étoile de Bessèges
1st Mountains classification
 10th Overall Tour de Luxembourg
 10th Polynormande
2006
 1st Circuit de l'Aulne
 2nd Grand Prix Pino Cerami
 6th Overall Four Days of Dunkirk
 6th Grote Prijs Jef Scherens
 7th Overall Driedaagse van West-Vlaanderen
 7th Overall Tour de Luxembourg
 7th Kuurne–Brussels–Kuurne
 7th Grand Prix de Plumelec-Morbihan
2007
 2nd Zwevegem Koerse
 3rd Overall Rheinland-Pfalz Rundfahrt
 6th Overall Tour de Wallonie
2008
 1st Beverbeek Classic
 2nd Wanzele Koerse
 6th Schaal Sels
 8th Overall Circuit de Lorraine
2009
 1st Omloop van het Waasland
2010
 2nd Overall Ster Elektrotoer
 8th Overall Circuit Franco-Belge
 10th Halle–Ingooigem
2012
 6th Overall Giro del Friuli-Venezia Giulia
1st Mountains classification
 8th Overall Flèche du Sud
 8th Ronde Pévéloise
 10th Beverbeek Classic
2013
 1st Stage 2a Tour de Guadeloupe
 2nd Overall Tour de Singkarak
1st Stage 3
 8th Overall Boucle de l'Artois
2014
 1st Stage 2a Tour de Guadeloupe
 6th Circuit de Wallonie
 6th Duo Normand (with Boris Carène)
2015
 9th Overall Tour de Hongrie

External links
 

Living people
1979 births
Belgian male cyclists
Tour de Guadeloupe stage winners
Cyclists from Limburg (Belgium)
People from Wellen